Menachem Mendel Schneerson (Rabbinic/old-fashioned Hebrew: מנחם מענדל שניאורסאהן; modern spelling: מנחם מנדל שניאורסון; April 5, 1902 OS – June 12, 1994; AM 11 Nissan 5662 – 3 Tammuz 5754), known to many as the Lubavitcher Rebbe or simply the Rebbe, was an Orthodox rabbi and the most recent Rebbe of the Lubavitch Hasidic dynasty. He is considered one of the most influential Jewish leaders of the 20th century.

As leader of the Chabad-Lubavitch movement, he took an insular Hasidic group that almost came to an end with the Holocaust and transformed it into one of the most influential movements in religious Jewry, with an international network of over 5,000 educational and social centers. The institutions he established include kindergartens, schools, drug-rehabilitation centers, care-homes for the disabled, and synagogues.

Schneerson's published teachings fill more than 400 volumes, and he is noted for his contributions to Jewish continuity and religious thought, as well as his wide-ranging contributions to traditional Torah scholarship. He is recognized as the pioneer of Jewish outreach. During his lifetime, many of his adherents believed that he was the Messiah. His own attitude to the subject, and whether he openly encouraged this, is hotly debated among academics. During Schneerson's lifetime, the messianic controversy and other issues elicited fierce criticism from many quarters in the Orthodox world, especially earning him the enmity of Rabbi Elazar Shach. 

In 1978, the U.S. Congress asked President Jimmy Carter to designate Schneerson's birthday as the national Education Day U.S. It has been since commemorated as Education and Sharing Day. In 1994, Schneerson was posthumously awarded the Congressional Gold Medal for his "outstanding and lasting contributions toward improvements in world education, morality, and acts of charity." Schneerson's resting place attracts both Jews and non-Jews for prayer.

Biography

Early life and education

Menachem Mendel Schneerson was born on April 5, 1902 (OS) (11 Nissan, 5662) in the Black Sea port of Nikolaev in the Russian Empire (now Mykolaiv in Ukraine). His father was rabbi Levi Yitzchak Schneerson, a renowned Talmudic scholar and authority on Kabbalah and Jewish law. His mother was Rebbetzin Chana Schneerson. He was named after the third Chabad rebbe Menachem Mendel Schneersohn, the Tzemach Tzedek, from whom he was a direct patrilineal descendant.

In 1907, when Schneerson was five years old, the family moved to Yekatrinoslav (today, Dnipro), where Levi Yitzchak was appointed Chief Rabbi of the city. He served until 1939, when he was exiled by the Soviets to Kazakhstan. Schneerson had two younger brothers: Dov Ber, who was murdered in 1944 by Nazi collaborators, and Yisrael Aryeh Leib, who died in 1952 while completing doctoral studies at Liverpool University.

During his youth, he received a private education and was tutored by Zalman Vilenkin from 1909 through 1913. When Schneerson was 11 years old, Vilenkin informed his father that he had nothing more to teach his son. At that point, Levi Yitzchak began teaching his son Talmud and rabbinic literature, as well as Kabbalah. Schneerson proved gifted in both Talmudic and Kabbalistic study and also took exams as an external student of the local Soviet school. He was considered an illui and genius, and by the time he was 17, he had mastered the entire Talmud, some 5,894 pages, as well as all its early commentaries.

Throughout his childhood Schneerson was involved in the affairs of his father's office. He was also said to have acted as an interpreter between the Jewish community and the Russian authorities on a number of occasions. Levi Yitzchak's courage and principles were a guide to his son for the rest of his life. Many years later, when he once reminisced about his youth, Schneerson said "I have the education of the first-born son of the rabbi of Yekaterinoslav. When it comes to saving lives, I speak up whatever others may say."

Schneerson went on to receive separate rabbinical ordinations from the Rogatchover Gaon, Yosef Rosen, and Yechiel Yaakov Weinberg, author of Sridei Aish.

Marriage and family life
In 1923, Schneerson visited the sixth Chabad-Lubavitch Rebbe, Yosef Yitzchak Schneersohn, for the first time. He met the rabbi's middle daughter Chaya Mushka (Mousia) – they were distant cousins. Sometime later they became engaged, but were not married until 1928 in Warsaw, Poland. Taking great pride in his son-in-law's outstanding scholarship, Yosef Yitzchak asked him to engage in learned conversation with the great Torah scholars that were present at the wedding, such as Meir Shapiro and Menachem Ziemba. Menachem Mendel and Chaya Mushka were married for 60 years, and were childless.

Menachem Mendel Schneerson and Yosef Yitzchak Schneersohn were both descendants of Menachem Mendel Schneersohn, known as the Tzemach Tzedek, the third Rebbe of Chabad Lubavitch. Schneerson later commented that the day of his marriage bound the community to him and him to the community.

In 1947 Schneerson traveled to Paris, to take his mother, Chana Schneerson, back to New York City with him. Schneerson would visit her every day and twice each Friday and prepare her a tea. In 1964, Chana Schneerson died.

On February 10, 1988, Schneerson's wife, Chaya Mushka Schneerson died. A year after the death of his wife, when the traditional year of Jewish mourning had passed, Schneerson moved into his study above the central Lubavitch synagog on Eastern Parkway.

Berlin

After his wedding to Chaya Mushka in 1928, Schneerson and his wife moved to Berlin, where he was assigned specific communal tasks by his father-in-law Yosef Yitzchak Schneersohn, who also requested that he write scholarly annotations to the responsa and various hasidic discourses of the earlier Rebbes of Chabad-Lubavitch. Schneerson studied mathematics, physics, and philosophy at the University of Berlin. He would later recall that he enjoyed Erwin Schrödinger's lectures. His father-in-law took great pride in his erudite son-in-law's scholarly attainments, and paid for all the tuition expenses and helped facilitate his studies throughout.

During his stay in Berlin, his father-in-law encouraged him to become more of a public figure, but Schneerson described himself as an introvert, and was known to plead with acquaintances not to make a fuss over the fact that he was the son-in-law of Yosef Yitzchak Schneersohn.

While in Berlin, Schneerson met Joseph B. Soloveitchik and the two formed a friendship that remained between them years later when they both emigrated to America.
He wrote hundreds of pages of his own original Torah discourses, and conducted a serious interchange of halachic correspondence with many of Eastern Europe's leading rabbinic figures, including the Talmudic genius known as the Rogachover Gaon. In 1933 he also met with Chaim Elazar Shapiro, as well as with Talmudist Shimon Shkop. During this time he kept a diary in which he would carefully document his private conversations with his father-in-law, as well as his kabbalistic correspondence with his father, Levi Yitzchak Schneerson.

Paris
In 1933, after the rise of the Nazi party in Germany, the Schneersons left Berlin and moved to Paris, where Menachem Mendel (known as "RaMash" before accepting the leadership of Chabad) continued his religious and communal activities on behalf of his father-in-law, Yosef Yitzchak. 

While in Paris he took a two-year course in engineering at a vocational college, where he was a mediocre student; this was his only formal secular education.

During that time, Yosef Yitzchak recommended that Professor Alexander Vasilyevitch Barchenko consult with Schneerson regarding various religious and mystical matters, and prominent rabbis, such as Yerachmiel Binyaminson and Eliyahu Eliezer Dessler turned to Schneerson with their rabbinic and kabbalistic queries.

On June 11, 1940, three days before Paris fell to the Nazis, the Schneersons fled to Vichy, and later to Nice, where they stayed until their final escape from Europe in 1941.

New York
In 1941, Schneerson escaped from Europe via Lisbon, Portugal. On the eve of his departure, Schneerson penned a treatise where he revealed his vision for the future of world Jewry and humanity. He and his wife Chaya Mushka arrived in New York on June 23, 1941.

Shortly after his arrival, his father-in-law appointed him director and chairman of the three Chabad central organizations, Merkos L'Inyonei Chinuch, Machneh Israel and Kehot Publication Society, placing him at the helm of the movement's Jewish educational, social services, and publishing networks. Over the next decade, Yosef Yitzchak referred many of the scholarly questions that had been inquired of him to his son-in-law. He became increasingly known as a personal representative of Yosef Yitzchak.

During the 1940s, Schneerson became a naturalized US citizen and, seeking to contribute to the war effort, he volunteered at the Brooklyn Navy Yard, using his electrical engineering background to draw wiring diagrams for the battleship USS Missouri (BB-63), and other classified military work.

In 1942 Schneerson launched the Merkos Shlichus program where he would send pairs of yeshiva students to remote locations across the country during their summer vacations to teach Jews in isolated communities about their heritage and offer education to their children.

As chairman and editor in chief of Kehot, Schneerson published the works of the earlier Rebbes of Chabad. He also published his own works including the Hayom Yom in 1943 and Hagadda in 1946.

On a visit to Paris in 1947 he established a school for girls and worked with local organizations to assist with housing for refugees and displaced persons. Schneerson often explained that his goal was to "make the world a better place," and to do what he could to eliminate all suffering. In a letter to Israeli President Yitzchak Ben Tzvi, Schneerson wrote that when he was a child the vision of the future redemption began to take form in his imagination "a redemption of such magnitude and grandeur through which the purpose of the suffering, the harsh decrees and annihilation of exile will be understood ..."

In 1991, a car accompanying Schneerson's motorcade accidentally struck two Guyanese-American children while attempting to catch up to Schneerson's vehicle. One of the children was killed. The incident triggered the Crown Heights riot.

Seventh Chabad Rebbe
After the death of Yosef Yitzchak Schneersohn in 1950, Chabad followers began persuading Schneerson to succeed his father-in-law as Rebbe on the basis of his scholarship, piety, and dynasty. Schneerson was reluctant, and actively refused to accept leadership of the movement. He continued, however, all the communal activities he had previously headed. It would take a full year until he was persuaded by the elders of the movement to accept the post.

On the first anniversary of his father-in-law's passing, 10 Shevat 1951, in a ceremony attended by several hundred rabbis and Jewish leaders from all parts of the United States and Canada, Schneerson delivered a Hasidic discourse (Ma'amar), the equivalent to a President-elect taking the oath of office, and formally became the Rebbe. On the night of his acceptance, members of the Israeli Cabinet and Israel's Chief Rabbi Yitzhak Herzog sent him congratulatory messages.

Reiterating a longstanding core Chabad principle at his inaugural talk, he demanded that each individual exert themselves in advancing spiritually, and not rely on the Rebbe to do it for them, saying:
"Now listen, Jews. Generally, in Chabad it has been demanded that each individual work on themselves, and not rely on the Rebbes. One must, on their own, transform the folly of materialism and the passion of the 'animal soul' to holiness. I do not,  God Forbid, recuse myself from assisting as much as possible, however; if one does not work on themselves, what good will submitting notes, singing songs, and saying lechayim do?" At the same talk, Schneerson said "one must go to a place where nothing is known of Godliness, nothing is known of Judaism, nothing is even known of the Hebrew alphabet, and while there to put oneself aside and ensure that the other calls out to God." When he spoke to Forward journalist Asher Penn that year, he said, "we must stop insisting that Judaism is in danger, an assertion that does little but place Jewry on the defensive. We need to go on the offensive."

As Rebbe, Schneerson would receive visitors for private meetings, known as yechidus, on Sunday and Thursday evenings. Those meetings would begin at 8 pm and often continue until five or six in the morning and were open to everyone. Schneerson, who spoke several languages including English, Yiddish, Hebrew, French, Russian, German and Italian, would converse with people on all issues and offer his advice on both spiritual and mundane matters. Politicians and leaders from across the globe came to meet him, but Schneerson showed no preference to one person over another. His secretary once even declined to admit John F. Kennedy because Schneerson was already meeting 'ordinary' people who had requested appointments months previously. Those meetings were discontinued in 1982 when it became impossible to accommodate the large number of people. Meetings were then held only for those who had a special occasion, such as a bride and groom for their wedding or a boy and his family on the occasion of a bar mitzvah.

During his four decades as Rebbe, Schneerson would deliver regular addresses, centered on the weekly Torah portion and on various tractates of the Talmud. These talks, delivered without text or notes, would last for several hours, and sometimes went for eight or nine hours without a break. During the talks, Schneerson demonstrated a unique approach in explaining seemingly different concepts by analysis of the fundamental principle common to the entire tractate, and referenced both classic and esoteric sources from all periods, citing entire sections by heart.

Outreach, spiritual and political campaigns

Women and girls

In 1951 Schneerson established a Chabad women's and girl's organization and a youth organization in Israel. Their mission was to engage in outreach which was exclusively directed at women and teens. In 1953 he opened branches of these organizations in New York, London and Toronto. In a marked departure from an entrenched tendency to limit high-level Torah education to men and boys, Schneerson equally addressed his teachings to both genders. He addressed meetings of the organizations, and led gatherings exclusively for women. Schneerson would describe the increase in Torah study by women as one of the "positive innovations of the later generations."

International outreach

That same year, Schneerson sent his first emissary to Morocco, and established schools and a synagogue for the Moroccan Jewish community. In 1958 Schneerson established schools and synagogs in Detroit, Michigan, in Milan, Italy, and in London, England. In 1988, Schneerson sent 22-year-old Rabbi Shmuley Boteach as a Chabad-Lubavitch shaliach (emissary) to Oxford, England, where he served as rabbi to Oxford University's students for 11 years.

Beginning in the 1960s, Schneerson instituted a system of "mitzvah campaigns" to encourage the observance of ten basic Jewish practices, such as tefillin for men, Shabbat candles for women, and loving your fellow for all people. Schneersohn's campaign brought the concept of tefillin to Jewish men everywhere, and he has been referred to as "the great modern popularizer of tefillin." Until his campaign, tefillin was largely the domain of the meticulously observant.

Following the death of his mother Chana Schneerson in 1964, Schneerson began to offer an additional weekly sermon in her memory. These sermons consisted of original insights and unprecedented analysis of Rashi's Torah commentary, which were delivered at the regular public gatherings. Schneerson gave these sermons each week until 1992.

Chanukah campaign
In 1973, Schneerson started a Chanukah campaign to encourage all Jews worldwide to light their own menorah. After all tin menorahs were given out that year, a military manufacturer was commissioned to make tens of thousands of additional menorahs for distribution. In 1974, a public lighting of a Chanukah menorah was held by the Liberty Bell in Philadelphia, Pennsylvania and in years following menorah lightings on public grounds were conducted in cities worldwide. Legal challenges to the lightings on public grounds reached the Supreme Court and it was ruled that public lightings did not violate the Constitution. Public lightings continue in thousands of cities today.

Lag BaOmer parade

Chabad established an annual Lag BaOmer parade at '770', one of the largest celebrations of its kind, where thousands of Jews celebrate the holiday.

Iran youth immigration
In 1979, during the Iranian Revolution and Iranian hostage crisis, Schneerson directed arrangements to rescue Jewish youth and teenagers from Iran and bring them to safety in the United States. The militant Islamist hostilities towards the United States were seen by Schneerson as behavior that could threaten the country's status as an "untouchable" superpower, and that would cause it to try to appease Arab countries, thus "endanger[ing] the security of Israel." As a result of Schneerson's efforts, several thousand Iranian children were flown from Iran to the safety of New York.

Noahidism and Jewish outreach
In 1983 Schneerson launched a global campaign to promote awareness of the Supreme Being and observance of the Noahide Laws among all people, arguing that this was the basis for human rights for all civilization. Several times each year his addresses were broadcast on national television. On these occasions Schneerson would address the public on general communal affairs and issues relating to world peace such as a moment of silence in U.S. public schools, increased government funding for solar energy research, U.S. foreign aid to developing countries and nuclear disarmament.

In 1984, Schneerson initiated a campaign for the daily study of Maimonides's Mishneh Torah. Each year at the completion of the learning cycle there is Siyum celebration marking the end of the cycle and beginning of the new one. These events have been attended by many Jewish leaders.

Sunday office hours for charity
In 1986, Schneerson began a custom where each Sunday he would stand outside his office, greet people briefly, give them a dollar bill and encourage them to donate to the charity of their choice. Explaining his reason for encouraging charitable giving among all people, Schneerson quoted his father-in-law who said that "when two people meet, it should bring benefit to a third." People in line would often take this opportunity to ask Schneerson for advice or request a blessing. Thousands of people attended this event each week, which lasted up to six hours, and is often referred to as "Sunday Dollars."

Schneerson's wife, Chaya Mushka Schneerson died in 1988. During the week of shiva Schneerson wrote a will in which he bequeathed his entire estate to Agudas Chasidei Chabad, the Chabad umbrella organization.

During a talk in 1991, Schneerson spoke passionately about Moshiach (the Messiah) and told his followers that he had done all that he could to bring world peace and redemption, but that it was now up to them to continue this task: "I have done my part, from now on you do all that you can." A few months later, when a reporter from CNN came to meet him at dollars, he said, "Moshiach is ready to come now, it is only on our part to do something additional in the realm of goodness and kindness."

His message: become righteous
On Sunday, March 1, 1992, Gabriel Erem, the editor of Lifestyles Magazine told Schneerson that on the occasion of his ninetieth birthday they would be publishing a special issue and wanted to know what his message to the world was. Schneerson replied that "'Ninety', in Hebrew, is 'tzaddik'; which means 'righteous.' And that is a direct indication for every person to become a real tzaddik—a righteous person, and to do so for many years, until 120. "This message", Schneerson added, "applies equally to Jews and non-Jews".

Work habits
During his decades of leadership, Schneerson worked over 18 hours a day and never took a day of vacation. He rarely left Brooklyn except for visits to his father-in-law's gravesite in Queens, New York. Schneerson was opposed to retirement, seeing it as a waste of precious years. In 1972, on the occasion of his 70th birthday, instead of announcing a retirement plan, Schneerson proposed the establishment of 71 new institutions to mark the beginning of the 71st year of his life.

Illness and death 

In 1977, during the hakafot ceremony on Shemini Atzeret, Schneerson suffered a heart attack. At his request, rather than transporting him to a hospital, the doctors set up a mini-hospital at his office where he was treated for the next four weeks by doctors Bernard Lown, Ira Weiss, and Larry Resnick.
He made a full recovery from the heart attack with few if any noticeable lasting effects or changes to his work habits. 
Fifteen years later Schneerson suffered a serious stroke while praying at the grave of his father-in-law. The stroke left him unable to speak, and paralyzed on the right side of his body. During this time, the hope that Schneerson could be revealed as the Messiah (Moshiach) became more widespread.
 
On the morning of June 12, 1994 (3 Tammuz 5754), Schneerson died at the Beth Israel Medical Center and was buried at the Ohel next to his father-in-law, Yosef Yitzchak Schneersohn, at Montefiore Cemetery in Queens, New York. Shortly after Schneerson's death, the executors of his will discovered several notebooks in a drawer in his office, in which Schneerson had written his scholarly thoughts and religious musings from his earliest years. The majority of entries in these journals date between the years 1928 and 1950 and were subsequently published.

Following age-old Jewish tradition that the resting place of a tzadik is holy, Schneerson's gravesite is viewed by many as a holy site and has been described by the Yedioth Ahronoth as "the American Western Wall", where thousands of people, Jews and non-Jews, go to pray each week. Many more send faxes and e-mails with requests for prayers to be read at the gravesite.

Wills 
Schneerson died without naming a successor as leader of the Chabad-Lubavitch dynasty, causing controversy within Chabad about Schneerson's will. He did, however, write one legal will, which was signed before witnesses, whereby he transferred stewardship of all the major Chabad institutions as well as all his possessions to Agudas Chassidei Chabad.

Another will, no executed copies of which are known to be in existence, named three senior Chabad rabbis as directors of Agudas Chassidei Chabad.

Messianism 

Schneerson had a passion and desire to raise awareness of the coming of the Messiah. During his life, many of his admirers hoped that he would be revealed as the Messiah. They pointed to traditional Jewish theology which teaches that in every generation there is one person who is worthy of being the Messiah, and if God deems the time right, he will be revealed by God as such. Chabad followers also pointed to a tradition that in every generation there is one person who is considered the Messiah of the generation.
Schneerson's supporters have claimed that many Jews felt that if there was indeed a person worthy of such stature, it was Schneerson. Although Schneerson constantly objected to any talk that he could be the Messiah, this notion sparked controversy, particularly among those who were unfamiliar with these traditional teachings. Detractors criticized a children's song with the words "We want moshiach (the messiah) now / We don't want to wait," that Schneerson commended. Since Schneerson's passing, the Messianic movement has largely shrunk, although some followers still believe him to be the Messiah. The Chabad umbrella organization, Agudas Chasidei Chabad, has condemned Messianic behavior, stating that it defies the express wishes of Schneerson.

Global positions

United States

Schneerson spoke of the position of the United States as a world superpower, and would praise its foundational values of '"E pluribus unum'—from many one", and "In God We Trust". He called on the government to develop independent energy, and not need to rely on totalitarian regimes whose countries national interests greatly differed from the U.S. Schneerson also called for the U.S. Government to use its influence on countries who were receiving its foreign aid to do more for the educational and cultural needs of their deprived citizens.

Schneerson placed a strong emphasis on education and often spoke of the need of a moral educational system for all people. He was an advocate of a Department of Education as a separate cabinet position from the Department of Health, Education and Welfare. Schneerson proclaimed 1977 as a "Year of Education" and urged Congress to do the same. He stated that education "must think in terms of a 'better living' not only for the individual, but also for the society as a whole. The educational system must, therefore, pay more attention to the building of character, with emphasis on moral and ethical values. Education must put greater emphasis on the promotion of fundamental human rights and obligations of justice and morality, which are the basis of any human society".

The Ninety-Fifth Congress of the United States issued a Joint Resolution proclaiming 1978 as a Year of Education and designating April 18, 1978, as "Education Day, U.S.A.". Each year since, the President of the United States has proclaimed Schneerson's birthday as "Education Day, U.S.A." in his honor.

During his life, Schneerson had great influence on numerous political leaders from across the aisle, many of whom would seek his advice. He was visited by presidents, Prime Ministers, Governors, Senators, Congressmen and Mayors. Notable among them are John F. Kennedy, Robert Kennedy, Franklin D. Roosevelt Jr., Ronald Reagan, Jimmy Carter, Jacob Javits, Ed Koch, Rudy Giuliani, David Dinkins and Joe Lieberman.

According to Howard Mortman's book,  When Rabbis Bless Congress, Schneerson was the rabbi most mentioned in Congress.

Israel

Schneerson took great interest in the affairs of the state of Israel, and did whatever was in his power to support the infrastructure of the state and advance its success. He was concerned with the agricultural, industrial and overall economic welfare of Israel, and sought to promote its scientific achievements, and enhance Israel's standing in the international community. Schneerson consistently expressed enormous recognition of the role of the Israel Defense Forces and stated that those who serve in the Israeli army perform a great mitzvah.

In 1950, Schneerson encouraged the establishment of Israel's first automobile company, Autocars Co. Ltd. (Hebrew: אוטוקרס) of Haifa. By 1956, the company was responsible for 28% of Israel's exports. Schneerson established a network of trade schools in Israel to provide Israeli youth, new immigrants and Holocaust survivors with vocational training and livelihood. In 1954, Schneerson established a school for carpentry and woodwork. In 1955, he established a school for agriculture. In 1956, he established a school for printing and publishing and, in 1957, a school for textiles.

Although he never visited Israel, many of Israel's top leadership made it a point to visit him. Israeli President Zalman Shazar would visit Schneerson and corresponded extensively with him as would Prime Minister Menachem Begin who came to visit him before going to Washington to meet President Carter. Ariel Sharon, who had a close relationship with Schneerson, often quoted his views on military matters and sought his advice when he considered retiring from the military. Schneerson advised the general to remain at his post. Yitzhak Rabin, Shimon Peres and Benjamin Netanyahu also visited and sought Schneerson's advice. Israeli politicians and military experts who came to consult with him were surprised by his detailed knowledge of their country's local affairs and international situation on strategic and diplomatic fronts. Despite his advisory meetings with American and Israeli political notables, Schneerson stated his nonpartisan policy many times, warning of his non-involvement in politics.

Schneerson publicly expressed his view that the safety and stability of Israel were in the best interests of the United States, calling Israel the front line against those who want the anti-Western nations to succeed. He was opposed to land for peace, which he called an "illusion of peace", saying that it would not save lives, but harm lives. Schneerson stated that this position was not based on nationalistic or other religious reasons, but purely out of concern for human life. Benjamin Netanyahu said that, while he was serving as Israel's ambassador to the United Nations in 1984, Schneerson told him: "you will be serving in a house of darkness, but remember, that even in the darkest place; the light of a single candle can be seen far and wide ..." Netanyahu later retold this episode in a speech at the General Assembly, on September 23, 2011.

Just before the outbreak of the Six-Day War, Schneerson called for a global Tefillin campaign, to see that Jews observe the Mitzvah of wearing Tefillin as a means of ensuring divine protection against Israel's enemies. Speaking to a crowd of thousands of people on May 28, 1967, only a few days before the outbreak of the war, he assured the world that Israel would be victorious. He said Israel had no need to fear as God was with them, quoting the verse, "the Guardian of Israel neither sleeps nor slumbers". Within the Haredi community, criticism of the campaign was voiced at the Agudat Israel convention of 1968. However, following the incident, Yitzchok Hutner, a prominent Orthodox rabbi who had corresponded with Schneersohn in the past, wrote to Schneerson privately, distancing himself from the convention. Hutner wrote that he had not been at the convention and asked forgiveness for any pain his earlier letters (discussing halachic issues regarding the tefillin campaign) may have caused.

After the Operation Entebbe rescue, in a public talk on August 16, 1976, Schneerson applauded the courage and selflessness of the IDF, "who flew thousands of miles, putting their lives in danger for the sole purpose of possibly saving the lives of tens of Jews". He said: "their portion in the Hereafter is guaranteed". He was later vilified by ultra-haredi rabbis for publicly praising the courage of the IDF and suggesting that God chose them as a medium through which he would send deliverance to the Jewish people. Schneerson protested vehemently against those elements within the ultra-haredi society who sought to undermine the motivations and actions of the soldiers.

He corresponded with David Ben-Gurion on the issue of Judaism in the State of Israel, asking the Prime Minister to ensure that Israel "remains Jewish". He lobbied Israeli politicians to pass legislation in accordance with Jewish law on the question "Who is a Jew?" and asked that they add the words "according to Halakha" to the declaration so that it state that "only one who is born of a Jewish mother or converted according to Halakha is Jewish". This caused a furor in the United States. Some American Jewish philanthropies stopped financially supporting Chabad-Lubavitch since most of their members were connected to Reform and Conservative Judaism.

Soviet Jewry
Schneerson greatly encouraged the Jews who lived in Communist states. He sent many emissaries on covert missions to sustain Judaism under Communist regimes and to provide them with their religious and material needs. Many Jews from behind the Iron Curtain corresponded with Schneerson, sending their letters to him via secret messenger and addressing Schneerson in code name.

Schneerson, who had an intimate knowledge of the Soviet government and their tactics, opposed demonstrations on behalf of Soviet Jews, stating that he had evidence that they were harming Russia's Jews. Instead he advocated quiet diplomacy, which he said would be more effective. Schneerson did whatever was in his power to push for the release of Jews from the former Soviet Union and established schools, communities and other humanitarian resources to assist with their absorption into Israel. On one known occasion he instructed Senator Chic Hecht to provide President Ronald Reagan with contact information of people who wished to leave so that he could lobby their release.

Following the Chernobyl disaster in 1986, Schneerson called for efforts to rescue Ukrainian Jewish children from Chernobyl and founded a special organization for this purpose. The first rescue flight occurred on August 3, 1990, when 196 Jewish children were flown to Israel and brought to a shelter campus. Since then, thousands of children have been rescued and brought to Israel, where they receive housing, education, and medical care in a supportive environment.

Natan Sharansky, the Chairman of the Jewish Agency, said that Chabad Lubavitch was an essential connector to Soviet Jewry during the Cold War, while Shimon Peres has stated that it's to Schneerson's credit that "Judaism in the Soviet Union has been preserved".

Legacy

Impact
Schneerson initiated Jewish outreach in the post-Holocaust era. He believed that world Jewry was seeking to learn more about its heritage, and sought to bring Judaism to Jews wherever they were. British Chief Rabbi Jonathan Sacks said of Schneerson "that if the Nazis searched out every Jew in hate, the Rebbe wished to search out every Jew in love". He oversaw the building of schools, community centers, and youth camps and created a global network of emissaries, known as shluchim.

Today there are shluchim in all of the 50 US states, in over 100 countries and 1,000 cities around the world, totaling more than 3,600 institutions including some 300 in Israel. Chabad is very often the only Jewish presence in a given town or city and it has become the face of Jewish Orthodoxy for the Jewish and general world.

Schneerson's model of Jewish outreach has been imitated by all Jewish movements including the Reform, Conservative, Orthodox and Haredi. His published works fill more than 200 volumes and are often used as source text for sermons of both Chabad and non-Chabad rabbis. Beyond the Jewish world, Peggy Noonan has written that moral issues would be better addressed by leaders such as Schneerson than by politicians, and since his death, Schneerson has been referred to as the Rebbe for all people.

Recognition
Schneerson's contributions to education and the betterment of mankind have been recognized by every president since Richard Nixon. In 1978, Schneerson became the first rabbi to have a U.S. national day proclaimed in his honor, when the U.S. Congress and President Jimmy Carter designated Schneerson's birthdate as "Education Day USA." Each year since, the President has called on all Americans to focus on education in honor of Schneerson. In 1982, Ronald Reagan proclaimed Schneerson's birthday as a "National Day of Reflection", and presented the "National Scroll of Honor" that was signed by the President, Vice-President and every member of Congress.

Many officials attended Schneerson's funeral, including New York Mayor Rudolph Giuliani, Benjamin Netanyahu and the entire staff of the Israeli consulate in Washington.

President Bill Clinton penned a condolence letter "to the Chabad-Lubavitch community and to world Jewry" and spoke of Schneerson as "a monumental man who as much as any other individual, was responsible over the last half a century for advancing the instruction of ethics and morality to our young people." Israeli Prime Minister Yitzchak Rabin, cited Schneerson's great scholarship and contribution to the entire Jewish people and proclaimed "The Rebbe's loss is a loss for all the Jewish people." Foreign Minister Shimon Peres cited words from the prophet Malachi as applying with particular force to Schneerson: "He brought back many from iniquity. For a priest's lips shall guard knowledge, and teaching should be sought from his mouth. For he is a messenger of the Lord."

Shortly after his death, Schneerson was posthumously awarded the Congressional Gold Medal, honoring Schneerson for his "outstanding and enduring contributions toward world education, morality, and acts of charity". President Bill Clinton spoke these words at the Congressional Gold Medal ceremony:

In 2009, the National Museum of American Jewish History selected Schneerson as one of eighteen American Jews to be included in their "Only in America" Hall of Fame.

Schneerson's contribution with respect to comprehension of human emotion is considered by many to be unparalleled; as Elie Wiesel said of the Rebbe, "When the Rebbe was alone with anyone, it was an opening. He opened doors for his visitor, or his student or Chasid—secret doors that we all have. It wasn’t a break-in. It was just an invitation. And that was really the greatness of the Rebbe. I think the Rebbe had a great talent for that—one of the greatest and the best that Judaism has ever seen." Schneerson is often considered to be one of the most, if not the most, influential rabbis of the twentieth century.

Criticism
From the 1970s onwards, Elazar Shach of the Ponevezh Yeshiva in Bnei Brak was publicly critical of Schneerson, accusing him of creating a cult of crypto-messianism around himself. He objected to his calling upon the Messiah to appear and eventually called for a boycott of Chabad and its institutions.
Though Schneerson never responded publicly to Shach's attacks, he did rebuke those who disparaged (religious and non-religious) Jews and for bringing division among them in apparent response to Shach, explaining that "every Jew, regardless of differences and levels of observances, is part of Am Echad," the unified Jewish people.

Scholarship and works

Schneerson is recognized for his scholarship and contributions to Talmudic, Halachic, Kabalistic and Chasidic teachings. Joseph B. Soloveitchik, who knew Schneerson from their days in Berlin, and remained in contact once the two men came to America, told his students after visiting Schneerson "the Rebbe has a gewaldiger (awesome) comprehension of the Torah," and "He is a gaon, he is a great one, he is a leader of Israel."

According to Mordechai Eliyahu, former Chief Rabbi of Israel, his meeting with Schneerson "covered all sections of the Torah". Eliyahu said, "The Rebbe jumped effortlessly from one Talmudic tractate to another, and from there to Kabbalah and then to Jewish law ... It was as if he had just finished studying these very topics from the holy books. The whole Torah was an open book in front of him".

Schneerson's teachings have been published in more than two hundred volumes. Schneerson also penned tens of thousands of letters in reply to requests for blessings and advice. These detailed and personal letters offer advice and explanation on a wide variety of subjects, including spiritual matters as well as all aspects of life.

Books in Hebrew and Yiddish
 1943: Hayom Yom – An anthology of Chabad aphorisms and customs arranged according to the days of the year.
 1944: Sefer HaToldot – Admor Moharash – Biography of the fourth Lubavitcher Rebbe, Shmuel Schneersohn.
 1946: Haggadah Im Likkutei Ta'amim U'minhagim – The Haggadah with a commentary written by Schneerson.
 1951–1992: Sefer HaMa'amarim Melukot – chassidic discourses (6 volumes).
 1951–2014: Sefer HaMa'amarim Hasidic discourses including 1951–1962, 1969–1977 with plans to complete the rest (29 volumes).
 1962–1992: Likkutei Sichot – Schneerson's discourses on the weekly Torah portions, Jewish Holidays, and other issues (39 volumes).
 1981–1992: Torat Menachem Hitvaduyot – transcripts of talks in Hebrew, 1982–1992 (63 volumes).
 1985: Chidushim UBiurim B'Shas – novellae on the Talmud (3 volumes).
 1985–1987: Sichot Kodesh – transcripts of talks in Yiddish from 1950 to 1981 (50 volumes).
 1985–2010: Igrot Kodesh – Schneerson's Hebrew and Yiddish letters (33 volumes).
 1987–1992: Sefer HaSichot – Schneerson's edited talks from 1987 to 1992. (12 volumes).
 1988: Hilchot Beit Habechira LeHaRambam Im Chiddushim U'Beurim – Talks on the Laws of the Holy Temple of the Mishneh Torah.
 1989: Biurim LePirkei Avot – talks on the Mishnaic tractate of "Ethics of the Fathers" (2 volumes).
 1990–2010: Heichal Menachem – Shaarei – talks arranged by topic and holiday (34 volumes).
 1991: Biurim LePeirush Rashi – talks on the commentary of Rashi to Torah (5 volume).
 1991: Yein Malchut – talks on the Mishneh Torah (2 volumes).
 1992: Torat Menachem – Tiferet Levi Yitzchok – talks on the works of his father, Levi Yitzchak Schneerson on the Zohar (3 volumes).
 1993–2022: Torat Menachem transcripts of talks in Hebrew, 1950–1973. Planned to encompass 1950–1992 (76 volumes).
 1994–2001: Reshimot – Schneerson's personal journal discovered after his death. Includes notes for his public talks before 1950, letters to Jewish scholars, notes on the Tanya, and thoughts on a wide range of Jewish subjects penned between 1928 and 1950 (10 volumes).

Books in English (original and translated)
 The Teachings of The Rebbe - The Chassidic Discourses of The Rebbe in English.
 Letters from the Rebbe – six volume set of Schneerson's English letters.
 Path to Selflessness – work discussing the bond between the individual soul and God.
 Garments of the Soul – discussing the sublime importance of mundane activities, and their effect on the soul.
 The Letter and the Spirit – five volumes so far published of the Rebbe's English letters.
 Sichos in English – fifty-one volumes published of the Rebbe's talks in English.

References

Sources 
 Ehrlich, Avrum M. The Messiah of Brooklyn: understanding Lubavitch Hasidism past and present. Jersey City: KTAV Publishing, 2004. .
 Fishkoff, Sue. The Rebbe's Army: Inside the World of Chabad-Lubavitch. Schocken, 2005. 
 Heilman, Samuel C.; Friedman, Menachem M. The Rebbe. The Life and Afterlife of Menachem Mendel Schneerson. Princeton and Oxford: Princeton University Press, 2010. 
 Hoffman, Edward. Despite all odds: the story of Lubavitch. New York: Simon & Schuster, 1991. 
 Rapoport, Chaim. The Afterlife of Scholarship. Oporto Press, 2011. 
 Steinsaltz, Adin. My Rebbe. Maggid Books, 2014. 
 Telushkin, Joseph. Rebbe: The Life and Teachings of Menachem M. Schneerson, the Most Influential Rabbi in Modern History. HarperWave, 2014.

Further reading
 
 Deutsch, Shaul Shimon. Larger than Life: The life and times of the Lubavitcher Rebbe Rabbi Menachem Mendel Schneerson. Volumes 1-2 Chasidic Historical Productions, Volume 1- 1995, Volume 2- 1997.  (Volume 1),  (Volume 2).
 Elior, Rachel. "The Lubavitch Messianic Resurgence: The Historical and Mystical Background 1939–1996", in: Toward the Millennium – Messianic Expectations from the Bible to Waco (eds. P. Schafer and M. Cohen), Leiden: Brill 1998: 383–408. .
 Miller, Chaim. Turning Judaism Outwards: A Biography of the Rebbe, Menachem Mendel Schneerson. Kol Menachem, 2014. .
 Wolfson, Elliot R. Open Secret: Postmessianic Messianism and the Mystical Revision of Menahem Mendel Schneerson. New York: Columbia University Press, 2009. .
 Telushkin, Joseph "Rebbe: The Life and Teachings of Menachem M. Schneerson, The Most Influential Rabbi in Modern History." HarperCollins, 2014
 Eliezrie, David. The Secret of Chabad: Inside the World's Most Successful Jewish Movement. Toby Press LLC, 2015,

External links

Works available online
 The Teachings of The Rebbe - Chassidic Discourses (English)
 Chabad.org – Literature
 Sichos B'Laha"k – The Rebbe's unedited talks (Hebrew)
 Sichos in English
 Igros Kodesh (Hebrew)
 Toras Menachem (Hebrew)
 Hayom Yom (Hebrew)
 The Rebbe's 10-point Mitzvah campaign
 Audio recordings of the Rebbe's addresses (Yiddish)
 The Rebbe's weekday Farbrengen's (video)
 The official archive of all the Rebbe's weekday talks (Yiddish)
 Who Was Rabbi Schneerson?/Lecture by Dr. Henry Abramson/June 2013

Works available on iTunes
 AskTheRebbe! - Answers from the Rebbe's Letters. (English)

Biography
 Biography of Menachem Mendel Schneerson
 The Rebbe's life (in Hebrew)
 The Rebbe's life (English)
 Video Lecture on Rabbi Menachem Mendel Schneerson of Chabad by Dr. Henry Abramson of Touro College South
 Early Years: The Formative Years of The Rebbe.

Historical sites
 The Ohel, about Schneersons burial site
 Videos of the rebbe
 Proclamation of Education and Sharing Day 2002 by President George W. Bush also honoring the 100th birthdate of Rabbi Schneerson
 Education and Sharing Day, U.S.A., 2007
 Numerous proclamations by President Reagan citing work of Rabbi Schneerson and promotion of the Seven Noahide Laws
 Congressional Gold Medal Recipient Rabbi Menachem Mendel Schneerson 
 Tributes to the Lubavitcher Rebbe by Menachem Begin, Bill Clinton, Newt Gingrich, Israel Meir Lau, John Lewis, Joseph Lieberman, Yitzhak Rabin, Aviezer Ravitzky, Jonathan Sacks, Lawrence Schiffman, Adin Steinsaltz, Margaret Thatcher, Elie Wiesel and Elliot Wolfson.
 Family Tree
 Commemorative remarks  upon the occasion of the 10th Yahrzeit of the Lubavitcher Rebbe Rabbi Dr. Tzvi Hersh Weinreb of the Orthodox Union
 Timeline of Menachem Mendel Schneerson 1928–1938
 My Encounter with the Rebbe, an oral history project undertaken by Jewish Educational Media, JEM to record the history of Rabbi Schneerson

 
1902 births
1994 deaths
20th-century Russian rabbis
American electrical engineers
American Hasidic rabbis
American people of Ukrainian-Jewish descent
Chabad-Lubavitch Hasidim
Congressional Gold Medal recipients
Humboldt University of Berlin alumni
Jewish emigrants from Nazi Germany to the United States
Jewish messianism
Maimonides scholars
Orthodox rabbis from New York City
People from Kherson Governorate
People from Mykolaiv
People with acquired American citizenship
Rebbes of Lubavitch
Ukrainian emigrants to the United States
Ukrainian Hasidic rabbis
Writers from Brooklyn
Yiddish-language writers
Hasidic writers
20th-century American rabbis